Cobani is a village in Glodeni District, Moldova.

References

Villages of Glodeni District
Populated places on the Prut